Dawn Ellerbe (born April 3, 1974, in Central Islip, New York) is a former track and field athlete who specialized in the hammer throw. She is currently the assistant athletic director at California State University, Northridge and a popular fashion model and blogger. Ellerbe is a member of the University of South Carolina Athletics Hall of Fame and is on the Board of Directors for the United Way of the Midlands in Columbia, South Carolina.

Ellerbe was featured in the New York Times article, "Sports of The Times; At Sydney, the First Toss Goes to the Women" by George Vecsey. and by CNN Sports Illustrated, "Ellerbe leads U.S. in debut of hammer throw." Her interest in fashion was profiled in "My Way: Dawn Ellerbe" in skirt!Columbia.

During her time as a student athlete at the University of South Carolina, Ellerbe was a four-time NCAA champion, six-time All-American and five-time Southeastern Conference champion. After receiving her bachelor's degree in journalism from the University of South Carolina in 1996, Ellerbe continued competition.

Ellerbe is a five-time USA Indoor champion (1996, 1998–2001) and six-time USA Outdoor champion in the hammer throw (1995–2001). Ellerbe also claimed the gold medal at the 1999 Pan American Games in Winnipeg, Manitoba, Canada.

Then representing the United States in the 2000 Summer Olympics, Ellerbe finished in 7th place in the women's hammer throw competition with a distance of 66.80 metres.

International competitions

References

 USA Track & Field profile 
 University of South Carolina Athletics profile 

Living people
1974 births
Track and field athletes from New York (state)
People from Central Islip, New York
American female hammer throwers
African-American female track and field athletes
Olympic track and field athletes of the United States
Athletes (track and field) at the 2000 Summer Olympics
Pan American Games gold medalists for the United States
Pan American Games medalists in athletics (track and field)
Athletes (track and field) at the 1999 Pan American Games
Athletes (track and field) at the 2003 Pan American Games
World Athletics Championships athletes for the United States
South Carolina Gamecocks women's track and field athletes
Female weight throwers
Competitors at the 1997 Summer Universiade
Competitors at the 1999 Summer Universiade
Competitors at the 1998 Goodwill Games
Competitors at the 2001 Goodwill Games
Medalists at the 1999 Pan American Games
21st-century African-American sportspeople
21st-century African-American women
20th-century African-American sportspeople
20th-century African-American women